Józefkowo may refer to the following places:
Józefkowo, Nakło County in Kuyavian-Pomeranian Voivodeship (north-central Poland)
Józefkowo, Wąbrzeźno County in Kuyavian-Pomeranian Voivodeship (north-central Poland)
Józefkowo, Lipno County in Kuyavian-Pomeranian Voivodeship (north-central Poland)